Efthalia Siakalli (born 27 June 2003) is a Cypriot footballer who plays as a defender for First Division club Lefkothea and the Cyprus women's national team.

References

2003 births
Living people
Cypriot women's footballers
Women's association football defenders
Cyprus women's international footballers